The 2017–18 UEFA Futsal Cup was the 32nd edition of Europe's premier club futsal tournament, and the 17th edition under the current UEFA Futsal Cup format organized by UEFA.

In a rematch of last season's final, defending champions Inter FS defeated Sporting CP to win a record fifth title to close out the UEFA Futsal Cup era, as starting from next season, the name of the tournament will be changed to the "UEFA Futsal Champions League". Barcelona defeated Győri ETO to finish third.

Association team allocation
Starting from this season, the top three-ranked associations according to the UEFA Futsal National Team coefficient rankings can enter two teams. Moreover, same as previous seasons, the title holders qualify automatically, and thus their association can also enter a second team. If the title holders are from the top three-ranked associations, the fourth-ranked association can also enter two teams. All other associations can enter one team (the winners of their regular top domestic futsal league, or in special circumstances, the runners-up). Therefore, a maximum of 59 teams from the 55 UEFA member associations may enter the tournament.

Association ranking
For the 2017–18 UEFA Futsal Cup, the associations are allocated places according to their 2017–18 UEFA Futsal National Team coefficient rankings, calculated based on the following:
UEFA Futsal Euro 2014 final tournament and qualifying competition
UEFA Futsal Euro 2016 final tournament and qualifying competition
2016 FIFA Futsal World Cup final tournament and qualifying competition

Since the winners of the 2016–17 UEFA Futsal Cup, Inter FS, are from the top three-ranked associations, the fourth-ranked association can also enter two teams.

Notes
 – Additional berth for title holders
 – Did not enter
 – No rank (association did not enter in the competitions used for computing coefficients)

Distribution
Following expansion of the tournament, the top-ranked teams no longer receive byes to the elite round, and the number of teams in the main round is increased from 24 to 32. Teams are ranked according to their UEFA club coefficients, computed based on results of the last three seasons, to decide on the round they enter and their seeding positions in the preliminary and main round draws:
The title holders and the teams ranked 1–22 or 23 (depending on the number of entries) enter the main round, divided into Path A and Path B.
Path A contains the title holders and the teams ranked 1–11 and 16–19, and the 16 teams are drawn into four groups of four. The top three teams of each group advance to the elite round.
Path B contains the teams ranked 12–15 and 20–22 or 23, and together with the preliminary round qualifiers (8 or 9 teams), the 16 teams are drawn into four groups of four. The winners of each group advance to the elite round.
The remaining teams enter the preliminary round, and are drawn into groups of three or four. The winners of each group plus one or more best runners-up advance to main round Path B.

The elite round remains to be contested by 16 teams, drawn into four groups of four, where the group winners and runners-up from main round Path A are seeded into the top two pots and kept apart if they are from the same group. The winners of each group advance to the final tournament, which is played in the same knockout format as before.

Teams
A record total of 56 teams from 52 associations entered this season's competition. Two associations had no league as of 2016–17 (Faroe Islands, Liechtenstein). The champions of Iceland (UMF Selfoss) did not enter. Northern Ireland launched a futsal league in 2016, and entered for the first time, with their entrant to be confirmed after the draw in July 2017.

Among the entrants, 24 teams entered the main round and 32 teams entered the preliminary round. The hosts for the eight preliminary round groups and the eight main round groups were announced by UEFA on 20 June 2017.

Legend
TH: Futsal Cup title holders
CH: National champions
RU: National runners-up
(H): Preliminary and main round hosts

The draws for the preliminary and main rounds were held on 6 July 2017, 14:00 CEST, at the UEFA headquarters in Nyon, Switzerland. The mechanism of the draws for each round was as follows:
In the preliminary round, the 32 teams were drawn into eight groups of four containing one team from each of the seeding positions 1–4. First, the eight teams which were pre-selected as hosts were drawn from their own designated pot and allocated to their respective group as per their seeding positions. Next, the remaining 24 teams were drawn from their respective pot which were allocated according to their seeding positions.
In the main round Path A, the 16 teams were drawn into four groups of four containing one team from each of the seeding positions 1–4. First, the four teams which were pre-selected as hosts were drawn from their own designated pot and allocated to their respective group as per their seeding positions. Next, the remaining 12 teams were drawn from their respective pot which were allocated according to their seeding positions. Teams from the same association could be drawn against each other.
In the main round Path B, the 16 teams were drawn into four groups of four containing one team from each of the seeding positions 1–2 and two group winners from the preliminary round. First, the four teams which were pre-selected as hosts were drawn from their own designated pot and allocated to their respective group as per their seeding positions. Next, the remaining 12 teams were drawn from their respective pot which were allocated according to their seeding positions, including the eight group winners from the preliminary round whose identity was not known at the time of the draw, which were first allocated to fill position 4 of all groups before position 3.

Based on the decisions taken by the UEFA Emergency Panel, teams from Azerbaijan/Armenia and Kosovo/Bosnia and Herzegovina would not be drawn into the same group. Should any of the above teams win their preliminary round group and qualify for a main round group with a team they cannot play against, they would be swapped with the next available team in their seeding position following the numerical order of the groups.

Round and draw dates
The schedule of the competition is as follows.

In the preliminary round, main round and elite round, the schedule of each mini-tournament is as follows (Regulations Article 19.05):

Note: For scheduling, the hosts are considered as Team 1, while the visiting teams are considered as Team 2, Team 3, and Team 4 according to their coefficient rankings.

Format
In the preliminary round, main round, and elite round, each group is played as a round-robin mini-tournament at the pre-selected hosts.

In the final tournament, the four qualified teams play in knockout format (semi-finals, third place match, and final), either at a host selected by UEFA from one of the teams, or at a neutral venue.

Tiebreakers
In the preliminary round, main round, and elite round, teams are ranked according to points (3 points for a win, 1 point for a draw, 0 points for a loss), and if tied on points, the following tiebreaking criteria are applied, in the order given, to determine the rankings (Regulations Articles 14.01 and 14.02):
Points in head-to-head matches among tied teams;
Goal difference in head-to-head matches among tied teams;
Goals scored in head-to-head matches among tied teams;
If more than two teams are tied, and after applying all head-to-head criteria above, a subset of teams are still tied, all head-to-head criteria above are reapplied exclusively to this subset of teams;
Goal difference in all group matches;
Goals scored in all group matches;
Penalty shoot-out if only two teams have the same number of points, and they met in the last round of the group and are tied after applying all criteria above (not used if more than two teams have the same number of points, or if their rankings are not relevant for qualification for the next stage);
Disciplinary points (red card = 3 points, yellow card = 1 point, expulsion for two yellow cards in one match = 3 points);
UEFA club coefficient;
Drawing of lots.

Preliminary round
The winners of each group advanced to the main round path B to join the eight teams which received byes to the main round path B (while the remaining 16 teams received byes to the main round Path A).

All times are CEST (UTC+2).

Group A

Group B

Group C

Group D

Group E

Group F

Group G

Group H

Main round
All times are CEST (UTC+2).

Path A
The top three teams of each group advanced to the elite round.

Group 1

Group 2

Group 3

Group 4

Path B
The winners of each group advanced to the elite round.

According to the original main round draw, the winners of Group F would have played in Group 8, which contained Araz Naxçivan (Azerbaijan). However, since Leo Futsal (Armenia) won Group F, and teams from Armenia and Azerbaijan cannot play each other, they were moved to Group 5, swapping with the winners of Group C, Luxol St Andrews.

Group 5

Group 6

Group 7

Group 8

Elite round
The draw for the elite round was held on 19 October 2017, 13:30 CEST, at the UEFA headquarters in Nyon, Switzerland. The 16 teams were drawn into four groups of four, containing one Path A group winners (seeding position 1), one Path A group runners-up (seeding position 2), and two teams which were either Path A group third-placed teams or Path B group winners (seeding positions 3 or 4). First, the four teams which were pre-selected as hosts (marked by (H) below) were drawn from their own designated pot and allocated to their respective group as per their seeding positions. Next, the remaining 12 teams were drawn from their respective pot which were allocated according to their seeding positions. For teams (including hosts) which were neither Path A group winners nor runners-up, they were first allocated to fill position 4 of all groups before position 3. Winners and runners-up from the same Path A group could not be drawn in the same group, but third-placed teams could be drawn in the same group as winners or runners-up from the same Path A group. Teams from the same association could be drawn against each other. Based on the decisions taken by the UEFA Emergency Panel, teams from Russia and Ukraine would not be drawn into the same group.

The winners of each group advance to the final tournament.

All times are CET (UTC+1).

Group A

Group B

Group C

Group D

Final tournament
The hosts of the final tournament were selected by UEFA from the four qualified teams, and with two Spanish teams in the final tournament, UEFA announced on 7 December 2017 that it would be hosted at the Pabellón Príncipe Felipe in Zaragoza, Spain.

The draw for the final tournament was held on 14 March 2018, 21:30 CET (UTC+1), at the Camp Nou in Barcelona during half-time of the UEFA Champions League round of 16 second leg between Barcelona and Chelsea. The four teams were drawn into two semi-finals without any restrictions.

In the final tournament, extra time and penalty shoot-out are used to decide the winner if necessary; however, no extra time is used in the third place match (Regulations Article 17.01 and 17.02).

Bracket

All times are CEST (UTC+2).

Semi-finals

Third place match

Final

Top goalscorers
Notes

References

External links
Official website
UEFA Futsal Cup history: 2017/18
European league standings

2017-18
Cup
August 2017 sports events in Europe
October 2017 sports events in Europe
November 2017 sports events in Europe
April 2018 sports events in Europe